Patrick James Wood (born 16 September 2002) is an Australian professional soccer player who plays as a striker for A-League club Sydney FC.

Wood played youth soccer with Collaroy Cromer Strikers, Manly United and Sydney FC Youth before starting his professional career with Sydney FC.

Early life 
Wood attended St Paul's College, Manly.

Club career 
Wood was called up to Sydney FC's senior squad for the 2020 AFC Champions League. He made his unofficial first-team debut ahead of the tournament in a match against the Australian under-23 team in November 2020.

Wood made his A-League debut against Wellington Phoenix on 2 January, coming off the bench at the 82nd minute mark. On 30 January, Wood scored his first A-League goals, the first coming after being on the pitch for 6 minutes, steering his side to a 3–0 victory against Macarthur FC.

International career 
Wood was called up to an Australian under-20 national team camp in 2020.

In October 2021, Wood was called up to the Australian under-23 team for 2022 AFC U-23 Asian Cup qualification matches against Indonesia in Tajikistan. He made his debut for the side on 26 October 2021, missing an early penalty kick before later scoring Australia's second goal in a 3–2 win. Wood scored again in the second leg three days later, the only goal in a 1–0 win to secure qualification for the final tournament.

In May 2022, Wood was included in the Australian under-23 squad for the 2022 AFC U-23 Asian Cup.

Career statistics

Club

Honours 
Sydney FC Youth
 Y-League: 2019–20

Individual
 National Premier Leagues NSW top-goalscorer: 2020

References

External links 
 

2002 births
Living people
Soccer players from Sydney
Australian soccer players
Association football forwards
Sydney FC players
National Premier Leagues players
A-League Men players
Australia youth international soccer players